Zdeněk Pýcha (29 May 1926 – 11 May 2020) was a Czech ice hockey player who competed in the 1952 Winter Olympics. He was born in Prague. He died in May 2020 at the age of 93.

References

External links
 

1926 births
2020 deaths
Czech ice hockey defencemen
Ice hockey players at the 1952 Winter Olympics
Olympic ice hockey players of Czechoslovakia
Ice hockey people from Prague
Czechoslovak ice hockey defencemen